Anilios nema, also known as the thread-like blind snake, is a species of blind snake that is endemic to Australia. The specific epithet nema (“thread”) refers to the snake's slender body.

Description
The snake grows to an average of about 27 cm in length.

Behaviour
The species is oviparous.

Distribution
The species occurs in the vicinity of Darwin, in the tropical Top End of the Northern Territory. The type locality is Fannie Bay, a Darwin suburb.

References

 
nema
Snakes of Australia
Reptiles of the Northern Territory
Reptiles described in 1997